GCB Bank Limited formally known as Ghana Commercial Bank is the largest bank in Ghana in terms of total operating assets and share of industry deposits, with 14.2% of total industry deposits. In August 2017, the Bank of Ghana, the nation's central bank, announced that it had approved a Purchase and Assumption transaction with GCB Bank Limited for the transfer of all deposits and selected assets of UT Bank and Capital Bank (Ghana) to GCB Bank Ltd.

Overview
GCB Bank Ltd is the largest indigenous financial institution in Ghana with 184 branches.  , the bank's total assets were valued at about GHS9.7billions+, with shareholders' equity of approximately GHS:1.3billion+.

History
The bank was founded in 1953, with 27 employees, as the Bank of the Gold Coast. Initially, it focused on serving Ghanaian traders, farmers, and business people, who could not obtain financing from the expatriate banks. In 1957, when Ghana attained Independence, the bank re-branded to Ghana Commercial Bank, to concentrate on commercial banking, since Bank of Ghana had been created to function as the central bank and banking regulator. In the beginning, the bank was wholly owned by the Government of Ghana. However, in 1996, when government shareholding stands at 51.17%, the stock of the bank was listed on the Ghana Stock Exchange. In 2013, the bank renamed itself GCB Bank Ltd, with a new brand identity which was launched at the end of 2014. Today, GCB Bank Ltd serves the banking needs of large corporations, parastatal companies, small and medium enterprises as well as individuals. , the bank employs 1,532 staff, in branches distributed in all 10 regions of the Republic of Ghana.

Ownership
The shares of stock of GCB Bank Ltd are listed on the Ghana Stock Exchange and are part of the exchange's GSE All-Share Index. The government of Ghana maintains 21.4% shareholding in the bank, while the remaining 78.6% is owned by institutional and private investors. , there are about 21 investors in the stock of the bank as depicted in the table below:

Leadership
 Jude Arthur - Board Chairman
 John Kofi Adomakoh - Managing Director
 Socrates Afram - Deputy Managing Director ( Finance )
 Emmanuel Odartey Lamptey - Deputy Managing Director ( Operations )
 Samuel Kwame Yedu Aidoo - Executive Director ( Wholesale and Investment Banking )
 Osmani Aludiba Ayuba - Director
 Francis Arthur-Collins - Director
 Queen Mother of Denkyira Nana Saraa III - Director
 Nick Amartefio - Director
 Lydia Gyamera Essah - Director

Branches
GCB Bank Ltd maintains its headquarters in Accra, the capital of Ghana and the largest city in the country. The bank has over 184 branches distributed across most major urban areas of Ghana, with plans to refurbish many of them following a re-brand in 2014.

See also

 List of banks in Ghana
 Ghana Stock Exchange
 Economy of Ghana

REDIRECT

References

External links
 Website of GCB Bank
 GCB Bank 2016 Annual Financial Report
 GCB Bank Stock Quote At Ghanastocks.net

Banks of Ghana
Companies based in Accra
Banks established in 1953
1953 establishments in Gold Coast (British colony)
Companies listed on the Ghana Stock Exchange